"Ghetto Dreams'" is the first single from the Common album, The Dreamer/The Believer. The song is produced by No I.D. and features Nas. It was released on iTunes July 6, 2011. The song is featured on the Madden NFL 12 soundtrack.

Music video
On August 11 a music video for "Ghetto Dreams" was released via YouTube.

Reception
Reviews have been mostly positive. The production and lyrics have created a lot of buzz for the upcoming album, being slated as a major return to the 90's bangers. Universally the song has been praised for its '90s sounding production by veteran great No I.D.  Nas has been critically praised for his guest verse, along with his new single for his respective upcoming album, many have compared this to his Illmatic and It Was Written days, alluding to his previous 'King of New York' status.

Personnel
produced by No I.D.
mixed and recorded by Rob Kinelski (assisted by Anna Ugarte) at 4220 Studios, Hollywood
assistant engineer: Omar Loya
guitar and bass: Steve Wyreman
scratches by The Twilight Tone
manager: Joanna Pacchioli

References

2011 singles
Common (rapper) songs
Nas songs
Song recordings produced by No I.D.
Songs written by Nas
2011 songs
Songs written by Common (rapper)
Warner Records singles
Songs written by No I.D.